Horst is a municipality in the district of Lauenburg, in Schleswig-Holstein, Germany.

History
During excavations near Horst some Slavic relicts were found, dating back to the 7th Century.

References

Herzogtum Lauenburg